Carex virgata, the swamp sedge, is a species of flowering plant in the family Cyperaceae. It is native to Tasmania, New Zealand, and the Chatham Islands, and has been introduced to Great Britain. It is used in constructed wetlands for wastewater treatment.

References

virgata
Flora of Tasmania
Flora of the North Island
Flora of the South Island
Flora of the Chatham Islands
Plants described in 1853